The Kolkata Shalimar-Patna AC Duronto Express is a premium superfast express train of the Indian Railways connecting Shalimar Railway Station (SHM) to Patna Railway Station (PNBE). It is currently being operated with 22213 (M, W, F)/ 22214 (T, T, Sat) train numbers.

Stoppages
It stops only at ASANSOL JUNCTION railway station.

Engine Used
The Engine used for this Train is a WAP 7 of Santragachi shed from Shalimar to Patna.

Coach composition
The Duronto train provides a different category of accommodation. It has 1 AC tier, 2 AC tier and 3 AC tiers. The coach composition of the Patna Duronto is as follows:

See also
Duronto Express

References

http://indiarailinfo.com/train/timeline/edits-kolkata-shalimar-patna-duronto-express-22213-shm-to-pnbe/16936/1913/332
http://indiarailinfo.com/train/farechart/ticket-fares-kolkata-shalimar-patna-duronto-express-22213-shm-to-pnbe/16936/1913/332

Rail transport in Howrah
Transport in Patna
Duronto Express trains
Rail transport in Bihar
Rail transport in West Bengal
Railway services introduced in 2012